The 38th Indian Infantry Brigade was an Infantry formation of the Indian Army during World War II. The brigade was formed in October 1941, at Moascar in Egypt. The brigade only ever came under command of HQ British Troops Egypt and HQ Eighth Army and was disbanded in May 1942, at Tahag in Egypt.

Formation
1st Battalion, Royal Welch Fusiliers to December 1941
3rd Battalion, 10th Baluch Regiment to April 1942
1st Battalion, 1st Punjab Regiment December 1941
1st Battalion, Buffs (Royal East Kent Regiment) January 1942
Czechoslovak 11th Infantry Battalion January to March 1942
3rd Battalion, 1st Punjab Regiment January to April 1942
68th Medium Artillery Regiment Royal Artillery

See also

 List of Indian Army Brigades in World War II

References

British Indian Army brigades